Antsahanoro is a commune in northern Madagascar. It belongs to the district of Antalaha, which is a part of Sava Region. According to 2001 census the population of Antsahanoro was 16,253.

Primary and junior level secondary education are available in town. The majority 98% of the population are farmers.  The most important crops are rice and vanilla, while other important agricultural products are coffee and cloves.  Services provide employment for 2% of the population.

References and notes 

Populated places in Sava Region